Brachymeles minimus is a species of skink endemic to the Philippines.

References

Reptiles of the Philippines
Reptiles described in 1995
Brachymeles
Taxa named by Walter Creighton Brown